Alfred "Al" Porto (June 27, 1926 – July 6, 2005), nicknamed "Lefty", was a Major League Baseball pitcher who played in 1948 with the Philadelphia Phillies.

References

External links

1926 births
2005 deaths
Major League Baseball pitchers
Baseball players from Pennsylvania
Philadelphia Phillies players
Nashville Vols players
Portland Beavers players
Springfield Cubs players
Terre Haute Phillies players
Toronto Maple Leafs (International League) players
Tri-City Braves players
American expatriate baseball players in Canada